The 2012–13 season was Dunfermline Athletic's first season back in the Scottish First Division, having been relegated from the Scottish Premier League at the end of the 2011–12 season. Dunfermline Athletic also competed in the Challenge Cup, League Cup and the Scottish Cup.

Summary

Season
During season 2012–13 Dunfermline Athletic finished ninth in the Scottish First Division, following a points deduction, entering the play-offs losing 3–1 to Alloa Athletic on aggregate in the final and were relegated to the Scottish Second Division. They reached the first round of the Challenge Cup, the third round of the League Cup and the fifth round of the Scottish Cup.

Financial problems
The club failed to pay the players October wages on time and in November 2012, reports arose that there were unpaid tax bills due to HM Revenue and Customs. Chairman John Yorkston was adamant that any outstanding debt could be cleared, however further issues arose over the coming months as it was reported in December, January and February that players were paid late, and reduced wages, prompting to squad to lodge an official complaint with the SFL. In mid-February, the club announced it will launch their share issue, but it was cancelled at the last minute.

With the club facing a winding up order over unpaid tax of £134,000 on 26 March 2013, Dunfermline Athletic Football Club announced that the club would be put into voluntary administration, with accountancy firm PKF appointed administrators, and it was formally approved by the court the following day. Bryan Jackson, who was appointed to oversee the administration proceedings, announced on 28 March that eight players including Captain Jordan McMillan were to be made redundant, however manager Jefferies stayed, on the condition of his salary would be reduced. Assistant manager Gerry McCabe was also made redundant the following day. Players made redundant only had until 31 March to find new clubs, as this was the last day of player registrations for the 2012–13 season. The club's shareholder Gavin Masterton, who was responsible for placing the club in administration, apologised for his action. A week before the club went to administration, Pars Community, the club's largest supporters group, made a bid to buy the club, but the bid was unsuccessful and talks broke down. The club's debt is thought to be around 8.5 million pounds. On 9 April, as a result of entering administration the club were issued with a fifteen-point dedication and banned from signing any players aged over 21 until the club comes out of administration. The SFA later issued a further transfer ban running parallel to the original, meaning should the club exit administration prior to 31 December 2013 the ban would continue until that date. On 11 April 2013, the club applied for and were granted full administration at the Court of Session in Edinburgh.

Results and fixtures

Pre season

Scottish First Division

First Division play-offs

Scottish Challenge Cup

Scottish League Cup

Scottish Cup

Players

Captains

Squad information
Last updated 2 August 2016

|}

Disciplinary record
Includes all competitive matches.
Last updated 11 May 2013

Awards

Last updated 14 October 2012

Team statistics

League table

Division summary

Transfers

John Potter was initially released but later re-signed as a player and under 20 coach.

Players in

Players out

References 

Dunfermline Athletic F.C. seasons
Dunfermline Athletic